Flamboro Downs is a half-mile harness horse racing track in Flamborough, Hamilton, Ontario, Canada. It is also home to Flamboro Slots, which has a total of 808 slot machines.

The racetrack was founded in 1971 by Charles Juravinski and acquired in 2003 by Magna Entertainment.  In 2005, it was acquired by the Great Canadian Gaming Corporation.

See also
 List of sports venues in Hamilton, Ontario
 List of attractions in Hamilton, Ontario

References

External links 
 Flamboro Downs

Sports venues in Hamilton, Ontario
Horse racing venues in Ontario
Casinos in Ontario
Harness racing venues in Canada
1971 establishments in Ontario
Sports venues completed in 1971